Ukek or Uvek was a city of the Golden Horde, situated  on the banks of the  Volga River, at the Uvekovka  estuary.
Ukek marked the half-way distance between Sarai, the capital of the Golden Horde, and Bolghar, the former capital of   Volga Bulgaria.
Ukek was probably established in the 1240s, and it became an important trade center by the early 14th century.

Ibn Battuta stopped here, and called it "a city of middling size, with fine buildings and abundant commodities, and extremely cold."

Several medieval chroniclers make reference to Ukek. It is also marked on some contemporary maps, including the 1367 map by Dominico & Francisco Pizzigani  and the 1459 map by Fra Mauro.
Timur's troops sacked the city in 1395. Its ruins are at about 10 km downstream of the modern city of  Saratov. A village situated next to the ruins still has the name Uvek (Увек).
The ruins of Ukek were described by Anthony Jenkinson in 1558.

In 2014 archaeologists associated with the Saratov museum unearthed what they believed to be the remains of two Christian temples, along with artefacts identified as being imported from Rome, Egypt, Iran and China, indicating the wealth of the city.

Literature
Christian Martin Joachim Frähn: Über die ehemalige mongolische Stadt Ukek im Süden von Saratow und einen dort unlängst gemachten Fund, Sankt Petersburg, Buchdruckerei der Kaiserlichen Akademie, 1835
Leonard F. Nedashkovsky: Ukek : the Golden Horde city and its periphery, Oxford, 2004  Germany tried to reach Ukek in 1942.  The Whites fought the Reds in Ukek in 1919–1920.

References

History of Tatarstan
Geography of Saratov Oblast
Defunct towns in Russia
Destroyed cities
Populated places on the Volga
Golden Horde
Former populated places in Russia
Cultural heritage monuments in Saratov Oblast
Objects of cultural heritage of Russia of federal significance